Şarkıcı (Singer) is the seventh studio album by Turkish singer Sıla. It was released on 20 May 2022 by Sony Music Entertainment. The album was produced by Sıla herself, who wrote the lyrics for fourteen out of the fifteen tracks in the album in collaboration with other artists.

Music videos 
The first promotional singer from the album, also titled "Şarkıcı" was released together with a music video on 13 May 2022. The music video, directed by Bedran Güzel, garnered a million views in two days and the album became among the trending topics on Twitter in Turkey. The second music video, "Velhasıl", was released together with the album on 20 May 2022. The third music video, "Kalksın Uyuyanlar", was released on 21 October 2022 and dedicated to Mahsa Amini, an Iranian girl who died due to the brutalities of Iran's religious morality police. The fourth music video, "Arz", was released on 3 February 2023 and was made using footage from her concerts.

Critical reception 
Serhat Tekin of Hürriyet described the album's tone as "classical Sıla style" and named "Öpücük ve Kurabiye" as the song that stood out the most. Writing for the same paper, Hikmet Demirkol stated that Şarkıcı was a "very rich album in terms of musical style" and commended Sıla for releasing an album in a music market that is dominated by singles. Milliyets Mayk Şişman named "Sek" as the album's best song and added: "The album has a Turkish style on the one hand and a European style on the other. From the beginning to the end, the Aegean seam has been added to the fullest".

Track listing

Personnel 

 Gürsel Çelik - arrangement (tracks 1, 3-10, 12, 13, 15)
 Özgür Yurtoğlu - mastering, mixing (tracks 3, 4, 5, 7, 8, 9, 10)
 İlker Kaleli - advisor (tracks 1, 15)
 Serhan Yasdıman - guitar (tracks 1, 8, 9)
 Derin Bayhan - mixing (tracks 1, 15), recording (tracks 1, 3, 4, 7, 8, 9, 10, 12, 13, 15), drums (track 1)
 Can Şeren - recording (tracks 1, 3, 4, 7, 8, 9, 10, 12, 13, 15)
 Arzu Alsan - vocals recording (tracks 1, 3, 5, 15), mixing (tracks 2, 6, 11, 12, 13, 14)
 Kerem Türkaydın - arrangement (track 2), guitar (track 2)
 Cudi Genç - bass (track 2)
 Alpdoğan Türeci - drums (tracks 2, 14)
 Burak Erkul - electric piano (track 2), harmonization (track 6), arrangement (track 14), piano (track 14)
 Cengiz Ercümer - percussion (tracks 2, 4, 9, 14)
 Volkan Cebeci - drums and percussion recording (track 2)
 Hasan Gözetlik - trumpet (track 2), trombone (track 2), flugelhorn
 İlter Kurcala - guitar (tracks 3, 5, 10, 13)
 İstanbul Strings - strings (tracks 3, 4, 5, 6, 7, 8)
 Caner Üstündağ - bass (tracks 4, 7, 9)
 Gültekin Kaçar - guitar (tracks 4, 6, 7, 12)
 Selim Boyacı - oud (tracks 4, 5, 9, 13, 15), bouzouki (tracks 13, 15)
 Ünal Aşkın - recording (tracks 4, 8)
 Mehmet Akatay - percussion (tracks 5, 8, 10)
 Aslıhan And - flute (track 6)
 Seher Karabiber - flute (track 6)
 Altuğ Tekin - French horn (track 6)
 Enç Coşkun - French horn (track 6)
 Kübra Çadırcıoğlu Uyar - French horn (track 6)
 Sertan Sancar - French horn (track 6)
 Efe Bahadır - guitar (track 6)
 Arıkan Sırakaya - drums (track 7)
 Meriç Memikoğlu - drums recording (track 7)
 Göksel Çelik - kanun (track 8)
 Özdemir Güz - oud (track 8)
 Serhat Şensesli - bass (track 10)
 Deniz Ilgar - vocals recording (track 10)
 Cenk Erdoğan - arrangement (track 11), guitar (track 11)
 Ergün Şenlendirici - clarinet (track 11)
 Kaan Yıldız - contrabass (track 14)
 Semih Çelikel - violin (tracks 14, 15)
 Emre Ünal - photographer
 Murat Yalçın - cover design
 Hande Kızıl - styling
 İbrahim Zengin - hair
 Hakan Kültür - make up

Release history

References 

2022 albums
Sıla Gençoğlu albums
Sony Music albums
Turkish-language albums